Igerna malagasica is a species of leafhopper from Madagascar.

References 

Insects described in 2013
Insects of Madagascar
Megophthalminae